Moataz Salhani (born 13 February 1987) is a Syrian footballer who plays for Sahab in the Jordan League.

On 15 March 2014, Salhani scored what is considered one of the greatest goals of all time, flicking a pass on the volley with his heel and into the net from 30 yards out.

Honours

Individually

 Top Goalscorer Jordan League: 2014–15 (11 goals)

References

http://www.101greatgoals.com/blog/either-the-goal-of-the-year-or-the-luckiest-golazo-ever-motaz-salhani-al-wehdat-vs-al-ramtha/

1987 births
Living people
Sportspeople from Damascus
Syrian footballers
Syrian expatriate footballers
Association football forwards
Al-Wehdat SC players
Expatriate footballers in Jordan
Syrian expatriate sportspeople in Jordan
Sahab SC players
Syrian Premier League players